Philodendron sodiroi is a species of plant in the genus Philodendron native to Colombia. A climbing epiphyte, it was once thought to be synonymous with Philodendron ornatum. Named after Luis Sodiro, it was first described scientifically in 1883. It is most recognizable for the silver mottling on its green, cordate leaves.

References

sodiroi
Flora of Colombia
Plants described in 1883